Cyrus Leaf Daniell (1877 – 28 February 1913) was a British fencer. He won a silver medal in the team épée event at the 1908 Summer Olympics. In 1908, he won the épée title at the British Fencing Championships.

References

1877 births
1913 deaths
British male fencers
Olympic fencers of Great Britain
Fencers at the 1908 Summer Olympics
Olympic silver medallists for Great Britain
Olympic medalists in fencing
People from Tooting
Sportspeople from London
Medalists at the 1908 Summer Olympics